Tōichirō Kinoshita  (Kinoshita Tōichirō ; b. 23 January 1925 in Tokyo) is a Japanese-American theoretical physicist. Kinoshita studied physics at the University of Tokyo, earning his bachelor's degree in 1947 and then his PhD in 1952. Afterwards he spent two years as a postdoctoral researcher of the Institute of Advanced Study, Princeton, New Jersey, and then one year at Columbia University. His research interests include quantum field theory, and the Standard Model.

He has been working at Cornell University since 1955. He was at first a research associate. In 1958 he became assistant professor, in 1960 associate professor. He became a full professor in 1963 (starting from 1992 as Goldwin Smith professor) at Newman Laboratory of Nuclear Studies of Cornell University. In 1962-63 he was a Ford Fellow at CERN. In 1995 he retired from Cornell as professor emeritus. He was a guest professor at the University of Tokyo, at CERN, and at the national laboratory for high-energy physics KEK in Japan.

Kinoshita is known for his extensive precision computations of fundamental quantities in quantum electrodynamics. The fundamental quantities involved electroweak theory and corrections related to the Standard Model, such as the anomalous magnetic moments of both the electron and the muon and the spectra of positronium and muonium, which made possible far more exact comparisons between theory and experiment. In 1962 he introduced the Kinoshita-Lee-Nauenberg theorem. In the 1970s he worked on quantum chromodynamics and quarkonium - spectroscopy with Estia Eichten, Kenneth Lane, Kurt Gottfried.

In 2001 Kinoshita had to admit there was an error in his computation of the anomalous magnetic moment of the muon, after experiments at Brookhaven discovered a discrepancy in the 9th to-right-of-the-decimal-point position — leading many to believe that experimental evidence had revealed "new physics". However, a group in Marseille examined Kinoshita's calculation in precise detail and found that the error resulted from a sign error within the computer algebra program used for the original calculation. When the software bug was fixed, the discrepancy was resolved.

In 1973-1974 he was a Guggenheim Fellow. He received in 1990 the Sakurai prize. In 1991 he became a member of National Academy of Sciences.

Publications 
 Kinoshita as editor and co-author, Quantum Electrodynamics. World Scientific 1990  (hbk);  (pbk)

External links 
 Biography from the APS

References 

Japanese physicists
Members of the United States National Academy of Sciences
1925 births
Living people
Cornell University faculty
Institute for Advanced Study visiting scholars
J. J. Sakurai Prize for Theoretical Particle Physics recipients
People associated with CERN